Bourneview Young Men Football Club (can be shortened to Bourneview Y.M.) is an intermediate-level football club playing in the Intermediate B division of the Mid-Ulster Football League in Northern Ireland. The club is based in Portadown, County Armagh.

References

External links
 Bourneview Y.M. Official Club website
 Daily Mirror Mid-Ulster Football League Official website
 nifootball.co.uk - (For fixtures, results and tables of all Northern Ireland amateur football leagues)

Association football clubs in Northern Ireland
Association football clubs established in 1962
Association football clubs in County Armagh
Mid-Ulster Football League clubs
1962 establishments in Northern Ireland